Ya'akov Schwartz is a former Israeli footballer who represented the Israel national football team.

Honours
Israeli Championships
Winner (2): 1986–87, 1992–93
Runner-up (2): 1983–84, 1984–85
State Cup
Winner (3): 1985, 1986, 1989
Israeli Supercup
Winner (1): 1986
Lilian Cup
Winner (1): 1985

References

1964 births
Living people
Israeli Jews
Israeli footballers
Israel international footballers
Footballers from Jerusalem
Beitar Jerusalem F.C. players
Hapoel Tel Aviv F.C. players
Hapoel Be'er Sheva F.C. players
Maccabi Jaffa F.C. players
Hapoel Lod F.C. players
Maccabi Netanya F.C. players
Liga Leumit players
Association football midfielders